Takydromus amurensis, the Amur grass lizard, is a species of lizard in the family Lacertidae. It is found in Russia, China, Korea, and Japan.

References

Takydromus
Reptiles described in 1881
Taxa named by Wilhelm Peters
Reptiles of Russia